Cold Water Creek is a  long 4th order tributary to Irish Buffalo Creek in Cabarrus County, North Carolina.

Course
Cold Water Creek rises about 0.5 miles northeast of China Grove, North Carolina, and then flows southeast and south to join Irish Buffalo Creek about 3 miles northeast of Flows Store.

Watershed
Cold Water Creek drains  of area, receives about 46.9 in/year of precipitation, has a wetness index of 397.40, and is about 41% forested.

References

Rivers of North Carolina
Rivers of Cabarrus County, North Carolina
Rivers of Rowan County, North Carolina